The Taisha Line (大社線) is the name of two railway lines in Izumo, Shimane:

Taisha Line (Bataden)
Taisha Line (JR West)